Kate Cory (February 8, 1861 – June 12, 1958) was an American photographer and artist. She studied art in New York, and then worked as commercial artist. She traveled to the southwestern United States in 1905 and lived among the Hopi for several years, recording their lives in about 600 photographs.

Early life
Kate Thompson Cory was born in  Waukegan, Illinois on February 8, 1861. Her parents were James Young Cory (1828–1901), born in Canada, and Eliza P. Kellogg Cory (1829–1903), born in Maine.  They also had a son, named James Stewart Cory. An abolitionist, her father was involved in the Underground Railroad. Their home was fitted with a secret room in the basement of the house. From there, his free black servants brought runaway slaves to awaiting boats on Waukegan Harbour, giving the impression that they were doing business for James Cory. During the Civil War the successful newspaper editor often single-handedly ran the Waukegan Gazette after his employees had left for the war and urged him to remain in Waukegan. The Corys moved to Newark, New Jersey in 1880 and her father, James Cory, managed his Wall Street interests in New York City.

Kate Cory was related to Fanny Cory, illustrator of the Little Miss Muffet comic book.

Career

New York
Cory studied oil painting and photography at Cooper Union and Art Students League of New York  She was an instructor at Cooper Union.

Cory was an American photographer, painter, muralist, and sculptor. She made her living as a commercial artist, contributing drawings to Recreation magazine and was involved with New York's Pen and Brush Club.

Beginning in 1895, Cory partnered with potter Charles Volkmar to create hand-painted plaques, cups and plates of historic people, like William Penn and Alexander Hamilton. Buildings figured in the designs, such as George Washington's headquarters. The works were painted in blue, primarily by Cory. Their shop, Volkmar and Cory Pottery, was located in Corona in Queens, New York. In 1903 Volkmar opened a pottery business in Metuchen, New Jersey called Charles Volkmar & Son.

Hopi villages 1905–1912
At the Pen and Brush Club, Cory met artist Louis Akin, who had just returned from the Southwest. He had made paintings of the Hopi Indians to promote tourism along the Santa Fe Railroad route. Her interest in the western United States had been sparked by Ernest Seton and when Akin told her of his plans to begin an artists' colony in Northern Arizona in 1905, Cory booked passage on a train to Canyon Diablo, Arizona,  and then traveled north 65 miles through the desert to the high mesa of the Hopi reservation.

She intended to visit the Hopi mesas where Akin intended to establish an artist colony for a couple of months of a tour of the western United States. When she got off the train she realized that she was the lone art colonist. Except for periods in Canada and California (1909), from 1905 to 1912 Cory lived among the Hopi at Oraibi and Walpi. In Oraibi she lived at the top of a Hopi pueblo, her space rented to her by a Hopi friend, that she accessed via stone steps and ladders. She was the only white woman brought into the secret life and practices of the Hopis. Cory learned the Hopi language, wrote about Hopi grammar, and mediated a disturbance.

While there, she painted the landscape and the Hopi people. She also took about 600 photographs, recording virtually all aspects of Hopi life, social as well as sacred. She took posed portraits, photographs of ceremonies and images of individuals, "which suggest a warm and spontaneous relationship". Her pictures depicted a traditional Hopi way of life on the precipice of having to assimilate or adapt to modern white America. Cory left the Hopi villages in 1912 and her viewpoints on life changed as a result of her relationships with the Hopi people, including eschewing modern consumerism.

She was not the first to photograph the Hopi; however, due to her intimacy with the culture, she was able to capture a more personal view than earlier photographers. She didn't sell her photographs, but would use them as illustrations for her essays, like Life and Its Living in Hopiland – The Hopi Women, which was published in a magazine in 1909. The same year she received an Honorable Mention for a painting exhibited at the Alaska-Yukon-Pacific Exhibition in Seattle. In 1915 the Smithsonian Institution bought 25 of the paintings Cory made during the time that she lived with the Hopis.

Prescott
She moved to Prescott, Arizona in 1913 and lived in a stone house built and furnished by Hopi workers. Cory exhibited a painting, Arizona Desert, at the Armory Show of 1913 which sold for $150, and received an honorable mention at the show.

Because of declining attendance at the Prescott Rodeo, Cory helped a group of local men calling themselves "Smoki" (pronounced Smoke-eye) with information about Hopi ceremonies that they performed. When the Smoki grew large enough to need a permanent facility and a museum, Cory assisted with the design and decoration of the buildings. She also painted her largest paintings for display in the Smoki Museum, where they still hang.

In her earnest intention to avoid living a wasteful life, she became known in Prescott for being eccentric. Fellow church members offered to replace her torn and tattered clothes. She was frugal, but gave away two cabins she owned to renters. She removed debris from rain water and used it to develop photographs. Rather than sell her paintings, she bartered them. She was described as having had "a plain, weather-beaten face, pulled-back hair, a determined black-clothed walk with a cane, as if every trip downtown were aimed at confronting the mayor."

Her paintings are in the collections of the Smithsonian American Art Museum, Sharlot Hall Museum, and the Smoki Museum of American Indian Art and Culture in Prescott. Her work is also owned by the First Congregationalist Church, where Cory was a member.

Death
She died in Prescott on June 12, 1958, at the Arizona Pioneers' Home and was buried at the Pioneers' Home Cemetery near her friend Sharlot Hall. The inscription at her gravesite names her "Artist of Arizona" below which is: "Hers Was The Joy of Giving".

Legacy
The negatives for the photographs that Cory took between 1905 and 1912 were found in the 1980s in a cardboard box along with other materials donated to the Smoki Museum. Not knowing how to preserve the negatives, the museum gave them to the Museum of Northern Arizona, who was better equipped to maintain and preserve the images. Marc Gaede, director of photography at the museum, Marnie Gaede and Barton Wright created the book The Hopi Photographs: Kate Cory: 1905–1912 based on some of the found images, some of which are ceremonial scenes. Due to concern from the Hopis about the rights to their cultural property, many images will not be published by the museum and are available in a restricted file for viewing by researchers.

The Smoki Museum in Prescott, Arizona has the largest collection of Cory artwork on display.

Her papers are held by the Sharlot Hall Museum.

Works

Books
 Kate Cory; A Legend of Thumb Butte.
 Kate Cory; Marc Gaede, Marnie Gaede, Barton Wright. The Hopi photographs: Kate Cory, 1905–1912. University of New Mexico Press; 1986. .

Paintings
 A Study of Kachinas for Children, watercolor, Smoki Museum, Prescott, Arizona
 Blonde Woman, oil, Sharlot Hall Museum, Prescott, Arizona
 Bouquet of Two Red Poppies, watercolor, Sharlot Hall Museum, Prescott, Arizona
 Brown Haired Woman, oil, 1935, Sharlot Hall Museum, Prescott, Arizona
 Butterfly Maiden, oil, Smoki Museum, Prescott, Arizona
 Buffalo Dancer, oil, 1919, Smoki Museum, Prescott, Arizona
 Colorado River, oil, 1929, Sharlot Hall Museum, Prescott, Arizona
 Desert Valley Landscape, oil, Sharlot Hall Museum, Prescott, Arizona
 Eliza P. Cory (artists' mother), watercolor, Smoki Museum, Prescott, Arizona
 Feather Ceremony at Sunrise, oil, Prescott Public Library, Arizona
 Five Indian Women with Baskets and Cooking Fire, oil, Sharlot Hall Museum, Prescott, Arizona
 Hopi Butterfly, oil, Smoki Museum, Prescott, Arizona
 Hopi Butterfly (2), oil, Smoki Museum, Prescott, Arizona
 Hopi Girl, oil, Sharlot Hall Museum, Prescott, Arizona
 Hopi Indian Maiden, oil, private collection
 Indian Maiden, oil, before 1916, Atchison, Topeka and Santa Fe Railway, Chicago, Illinois
 Indian with Hoe, oil, 1906, Smithsonian American Art Museum
 Inside the Kiva, oil, 1905–1912, Waukegan Historical Society, Illinois
 Local Wild Flowers, Granite Mountains in the background, oil, 1937, Federal Art Project, Sharlot Hall Museum, Prescott, Arizona
 Local Wild Flowers with rocky hills in the distance, oil, 1937, Federal Art Project, Sharlot Hall Museum, Prescott, Arizona
 Man, Full Length, oil, Smithsonian American Art Museum
 Mana with Ceremonial Robe (Portrait of Hopi Indian Woman), oil, 1909, Waukegan Historical Society, Illinois
 Mata Dexter (portrait), oil, Smoki Museum, Prescott, Arizona
 Mesa with Indian Village in Distance, oil, Smithsonian American Art Museum
 Migration of the Hopi Tribe in the Early 20th Century, oil, 1939, First Congregational Church, Prescott, Arizona (on permanent loan to the Smoki Museum)
 Moonlight Frolic, oil, before 1914, Atchison, Topeka and Santa Fe Railway, Chicago, Illinois
 Mother and Child, oil, Smithsonian American Art Museum
 Mountain Landscape, oil, 1937, Sharlot Hall Museum, Prescott, Arizona
 Native American Carding Wool, oil, Prescott Public Library, Arizona
 Navajo Brush Shelter, oil, Sharlot Hall Museum, Prescott, Arizona
 Old Man, oil, Sharlot Hall Museum, Prescott, Arizona
 Prescott, Arizona, oil, private collection
 Pueblo of Walpi, oil, before 1916, Atchison, Topeka and Santa Fe Railway, Chicago, Illinois
 Return of the Kachinas, oil, Smoki Museum, Prescott, Arizona
 Sun Ceremony, oil, Smithsonian American Art Museum
 Sunset or Sunrise over Mountain Valley, oil on Masonite, Sharlot Hall Museum, Prescott, Arizona
 TAWEA, oil, Sharlot Hall Museum, Prescott, Arizona
 The Baker, oil, Smoki Museum, Prescott, Arizona
 The Kachina, oil, Smithsonian American Art Museum
 The Migration, oil, Smoki Museum, Prescott, Arizona
 The Snake Myth, oil, Smoki Museum, Prescott, Arizona
 The Weaver, oil, 1900–1905, Waukegan Historical Society, Illinois
  Thumb Butte, oil (15.5x18), Private Collection, Prescott, Arizona
 US Army Biplane Flying across the Hills, oil, Sharlot Hall Museum, Prescott, Arizona
 Woman Nursing a Baby, oil, Sharlot Hall Museum, Prescott, Arizona
 Wu Wu Ceremony, oil, Smoki Museum, Prescott, Arizona

Photographs
A few of the photographs taken of the Hopi between 1905 and 1912:
 Corn crop covers the roof Hopi maiden Hopi man Hopi school girls in cauldron Hopi spinner Hopi water carrier Hopi weaver Hopi woman in traditional dress Landlady putting bread in oven Navajo Woman at New Oraibi Old Oraibi Piki making Pottery firing Young Hopi woman having her hair dressed Young married woman with corn pollen and braidReferences

Further reading
 Fillmore Gary. "Shadows on the Mesa-Artists of the Painted Desert and Beyond". Schiffer Publishing; 2012.
 Gaede, Marnie, et al. The Hopi Photographs: Kate Cory, 1905–1912. Chaco Press; 1986..
 Graulich, Melody. "I became the 'colony': Kate Cory's Hopi photographs," in Bernardin, Susan. Trading Gazes: Euro-American Women Photographers and Native North Americans, 1880–1940. New Brunswick, N. J.: Rutgers University Press, 2003.
 Hughes, Edan Milton. 2002. "Cory, Kate Thompson," Artists in California, 1786–1940.
 "Images of Hopi" Plateau. Magazine of The Museum of Northern Arizona. 1991.
 Johnson, Ginger. Kate T. Cory: Artist of Arizona, 1861–1958. 1996.
 "Kate Thomson Cory (1861–1958): From the Hopi Mesas to Prescott," in Dunbier, Lonnie Pierson, and Betsy Fahlman. Arizona's Pioneering Women Artists: Impressions of the Grand Canyon State. 2012.
 Loscher, Tricia. Kate Thomson Cory: Artist and Ethnographer of Arizona. Dissertation, M.A. Arizona State University, 2000.
 Nucci, Sarah Louise. Kate Thomson Cory: an independent Victorian woman in Arizona [Dissertation: M.A. Arizona State University], 2001.
 Palmquist, Peter E. "Women Photographers and the American Indian," in An Idaho Photographer In Focus. Pocatello, Idaho: Idaho State University, 1993, pp. 121–149.
 Phippen Museum of Western Art Proudly Presents Five Ladies of Prescott and Their Art (Prescott, Ariz: Phippen Museum of Western Art, Publications Committee, 1995).
 Wright, Nancy Kirkpatrick, and Mona Lange McCroskey. Kate Thompson Cory & Albert William Bork: Remarkable Westerners''. Prescott, AZ: Sharlot Hall Museum, 1997

External links 
 Kate Cory – Smithsonian
 Kate Cory – Waukegan Historical Society
 Kate Cory – The Smoki Museum

1861 births
1958 deaths
19th-century American painters
20th-century American painters
American photographers
20th-century American sculptors
19th-century American sculptors
20th-century American women artists
19th-century American women artists
Cooper Union alumni
American women painters
19th-century American women photographers
19th-century American photographers
20th-century American women photographers
20th-century American photographers